Klára Koukalová was the defending champion, but chose not to participate this year.

Teliana Pereira won the title, defeating Annika Beck in the final, 6–4, 4–6, 6–1.

Seeds

Draw

Finals

Top half

Bottom half

Qualifying

Seeds

Qualifiers

Draw

First qualifier

Second qualifier

Third qualifier

Fourth qualifier

Fifth qualifier

Sixth qualifier

References 
 Main draw
 Qualifying draw

Brasil Tennis Cup - Singles
2015 Singles